Windsor Park is the home ground of the Northern Ireland national football team.

It may also refer to:

In Australia
 Windsor Park, Tasmania, group of regional sporting grounds in Launceston, Australia
 Windsor Park, a sporting ground in Norlane, Victoria, Australia 

In Canada
 Windsor Park, Halifax, Nova Scotia, military housing & transport base, part of CFB Halifax
 Windsor Park (Edmonton), a neighbourhood in Edmonton, Alberta
 Windsor Park, Calgary, a neighbourhood in Calgary, Alberta
 Windsor Park, Winnipeg, a neighbourhood in Winnipeg Manitoba

In Dominica
Windsor Park (Dominica), a cricket stadium for the West Indies cricket team in Roseau, Dominica

In England
Windsor Great Park, a deer park on the border of Berkshire and Surrey

In New Zealand
Windsor Park, New Zealand, a suburb of Auckland

In the United States of America
 Windsor Park, a neighborhood in Austin, Texas
Windsor Park, a neighborhood in Queens, New York
 Windsor Park, a neighborhood in Alexandria, Virginia
 Windsor Park, a neighborhood in Indianapolis, Indiana
 Windsor Park Mall, San Antonio, Texas, a defunct shopping mall